Banya Bashi Mosque is a mosque in Sofia, Bulgaria.

History 

The mosque was designed by the famous Ottoman architect Mimar Sinan and completed in 1566, during the years the Ottomans had control of the city. The mosque derives its name from the phrase Banya Bashi, which means many baths. (In the Turkish language Banyo means bath and Baş pronounced Bash means 'head' or 'main', so looking at the location it is built on, a more logical translation of the name would be 'Head of the bath mosque') The most outstanding feature of the mosque is that it was actually built over natural thermal spas; one can even see the steam rising from vents in the ground near the mosque walls. The mosque is famous for its large dome, diameter 15m, and the minaret.

Currently, the Banya Bashi Mosque is the only functioning mosque in Sofia, a remnant of the Ottoman rule of Bulgaria that lasted nearly five centuries, and is used by the city's Muslim community.

See also 
Turks in Bulgaria
Ottoman architecture
Islam in Bulgaria

References

External links 
Historical photographs of the Banya Bashi Mosque

Mosques completed in 1566
Ottoman mosques in Bulgaria
Mosque buildings with domes
Buildings and structures in Sofia
Tourist attractions in Sofia
1566 establishments in the Ottoman Empire
Culture in Sofia